Rozhdestvenka is a rural locality (a selo) in Novosergeyevsky Selsoviet of Seryshevsky District, Amur Oblast, Russia. The population was 266 as of 2018. There are 7 streets.

Geography 
Rozhdestvenka is located on the Tom River, 48 km southeast of Seryshevo (the district's administrative centre) by road. Novosergeyevka is the nearest rural locality.

References 

Rural localities in Seryshevsky District